Minodronic acid is a third-generation bisphosphonate drug.  It is approved for use in Japan for the treatment of osteoporosis.  Its mechanism of action involves inhibition of farnesyl pyrophosphate synthase activity.

References

Bisphosphonates
Imidazopyridines